USS Vital (AM-474/MSO-474) was an  in service with the United States Navy from 1955 to 1972. She was sold for scrap in 1979.

History
Vital was laid down as AM-474 on 31 October 1952 at Manitowoc, Wisconsin, by the Burger Boat Company; launched on 12 August 1953; sponsored by Mrs. Edwina Smith; redesignated MSO-474 on 7 February 1955; and commissioned on 9 June 1955 at the Boston Naval Shipyard.

Mediterranean and North Sea operations 
Following shakedown and an availability at Charleston, South Carolina, Vital was deployed to the Mediterranean late in the spring of 1956. In addition to normal 6th Fleet operations and Mediterranean port visits, she participated in a special NATO minesweeping exercise conducted in the North Sea during September and October. The minesweeper returned to Charleston later that fall and began operations along the southern Atlantic seaboard of the United States. In March 1957, she moved to the Gulf of Mexico for a three-month training period at the conclusion of which she returned to Charleston and resumed normal duty.

Panama City homeport operations 
In July 1958, Vital's home port was changed from Charleston to Panama City, Florida. From the latter port, she participated in experimental work with the Operational Test and Evaluation Force under the auspices of the Naval Mine Defense Laboratory. She remained based at that port for the next 12½ years, departing periodically for deployments in foreign waters. The first break in her experimental work schedule came in August 1960 when she embarked upon a three-month cruise in the Caribbean.

Second Mediterranean tour of duty 
After returning to Panama City in November and resuming duty with the Naval Mine Defense Laboratory, she remained so occupied until February 1962, at which time the minesweeper headed across the Atlantic Ocean with the other units of Mine Division (MinDiv) 81 for a six-month tour of duty with the U.S. 6th Fleet in the Mediterranean.

Miscellaneous deployments 
She arrived back in Panama City in August and resumed services to the Naval Mine Defense Laboratory. Following 14 months of normal operations in the Gulf of Mexico, Vital headed south for a four-month assignment in the West Indies which she concluded at Panama City, Florida on 9 February 1964.
 
Upon the conclusion of that Caribbean deployment, Vital settled down to a routine of operations out of Panama City broken only by three Mediterranean deployments and an ascent of the Mississippi River in May 1967 to participate in the Cotton Carnival at Memphis, Tennessee. On 1 January 1971, Vital received word that her home port had changed back to Charleston. She arrived there on the 27th and, for the next 20 months, operated from that base as a unit of the Atlantic Fleet Mine Force.

Decommissioning 
On 22 September 1972, Vital was decommissioned at Charleston. She was towed to Hampton Roads, Virginia, late in November and, on the 30th, placed in the Norfolk Group of the Atlantic Reserve Fleet. She remained there until struck from the Navy List in September 1977. The ship was sold for scrap on 21 July 1979 by the Defense Reutilization and Marketing Service to Union Minerals and Alloys Corporation of New York City for $25,250.

References

External links 

 A Salute to the Minesweeper USS Vital (MSO-474), from geocities
 Photo album of George Scearce, Commander USS Vital (MSO-474)
 A Navy Minesweeper, USS Vital (MSO-474)
 USS Vital (MSO-474)
 USS Vital (MSO-474) Crew List
 USS Vital (MSO-474)
 USS Vital photos

 

Aggressive-class minesweepers
Ships built in Manitowoc, Wisconsin
1953 ships
Vietnam War mine warfare vessels of the United States